Messing Maypole Mill is a grade II listed Tower mill at Tiptree, Essex, England which has been converted to a residence. Prior to boundary changes made when the civil parish of Tiptree was established in 1934, the mill was in the parish of Tolleshunt Knights.

History
Messing Maypole Mill was built in 1775  by Colchester millwright John Mathett at a cost of £315 excluding the brickwork. Matchett owned the mill until it was purchased by miller Thomas Green in 1797. The mill passed to Edward Harvey on Green's death in 1806. Harvey died in 1829 and in 1829 the mill was purchased by miller James Peake. Peake was declared bankrupt in 1845 and the mill sold by his assignees. George Ransom was the next miller, and he introduced steam power. After the death of Ransom in 1884 the mill was run by his widow for a few years and then by Henry Cattermole. In 1890, the Colchester millwright Bryant replaced the old wooden windshaft with the cast iron  windshaft from the annular sailed mill at Roxwell. Bryant may have added the fantail at this time. Milling by wind ceased c1911. During World War I  the mill was worked by steam alone. Frederick King put the mill back to full working order in the 1920s, but the sails were finally removed in February 1927, leaving just the stocks. Milling continued until at least 1962, although the millstones were removed in 1960. Power latterly was by electricity. The mill was converted into a residence in 1969.

Description

Messing Maypole Mill is a four-storey brick tower mill with a domed cap. When built it had four Common sails carried on a wooden windshaft and was winded by hand. There was a stage at first-floor level.

The  diameter wooden Brake Wheel is of clasp arm construction, converted from compass arm. It has 72 cogs and is carried on a cast-iron windshaft which formerly carried four double Patent sails. The  diameter wooden Great Spur Wheel is of compass arm construction with 84 cogs. The mill latterly drove three pairs of millstones.

Millers
Thomas Green 1776–1806
James Peake 1806–1848
George D Ransom 1848–1884
Mrs. Ransom 1884–1887
Henry Cattermole 1887–c1911
Frederick King 1922–1937

References for above:-

External links
Windmill World webpage on Messing Maypole Mill

References

Windmills in Essex
History of Essex
Grade II listed buildings in Essex
Tower mills in the United Kingdom
Grinding mills in the United Kingdom
Windmills completed in 1775
Grade II listed windmills
Tiptree